Gregory Charles Warren (born 6 November 1973) is an Australian politician who was elected to the New South Wales Legislative Assembly as the Labor Party member for Campbelltown at the 2015 New South Wales state election.

Warren was a Camden Councillor, having served as mayor from 2011 to 2012, and worked in business logistics. His preselection was the first community preselection held by the New South Wales Australian Labor Party. Following his reelection at the 2019 New South Wales state election, he was appointed to Shadow Ministry under the portfolios of Local Government, Veterans Affairs and Western Sydney.

References

 

1973 births
Living people
Australian Labor Party members of the Parliament of New South Wales
Members of the New South Wales Legislative Assembly
Australian Army soldiers
New South Wales local councillors
Mayors of places in New South Wales
People from Dubbo
21st-century Australian politicians
Australian Institute of Business alumni